Jains are broadly divided into 2 major groups. These include the Digambara, whose clothing displays symbols of cardinal directions,
and the Svetambara who wear white clothes. Both of the groups are similar in their ideology but differ in some aspects.

The Digambara have a strict ascetic discipline which stresses the abandonment of money, personal property and other worldly things for achieving internal peace.
While Shwetambar are those who wear a white robe. These groups were formed a long time ago. Shwetambar group became from that common group due to those conditions.
Naturally both the sexes are different from each other in various aspects. In Jain dharam there are different roles for different genders.
Females are bound to some extent due to their body physiology and anatomy.
Those who want to control their mind and want internal peace should also control their sexual feelings. 
Many people consider that the difference in opportunities for females are less than males. It is because of these reasons that one of the major criticisms of the Jain religion is on the treatment of women. It is generally believed in Jainism that women are a lower species than men and are more prone to degradation.

Debates on women 
One of the most fundamental distinctions between Śvetāmbara and Digambara Jains is their respective views on women as mendicants, or nuns, that originated over their debates regarding nudity. The general consensus between the two sects is that the Jinas, and especially the last Tīrthaṅkara Mahāvīra, practiced naked asceticism. Digambara Jains claims that it is necessary for all mendicants to conduct their renunciation without clothing. For them, this represents the idealized practice of aparigraha, in which a mendicant renounces all property and possessions, including clothing. Śvetāmbara Jains, however, claim that nudity as the exemplary mode of asceticism is impossible in this period of the cosmic age, and as such, it is "deemed inappropriate." For the Śvetāmbaras, the white robes commonly associated with them are interpreted as mere tools that enhance religious life.

The debate on nudity would translate into a concern about the renunciant and soteriological potential of women. For Digambaras, women cannot become ascetics as they could not be naked, which was seen as "an essential component of the path to liberation." Since Women were seen as essentially immoral - and therefore unsuited to become a mendicant - because their bodies "generate and destroy life-forms within their sexual organs... thus repeatedly infringing nonviolence." Women, then, were exempt from spiritual liberation because their bodies consistently broke the cardinal rule of ahiṃsā. The Śvetāmbaras accepted the premise that naked nuns would be inappropriate; however, because they viewed clothing as auxiliary to religious pursuits, the issue of female mendicants was resolved as they would be clothed. Additionally, Śvetāmbara Jains argued that women were not exempt from spiritual liberation, given that there is nothing within Jain scriptures that precludes such.

The debates haunt the discussion of gender, and particularly women, in Jainism, as the mendicant tradition is seen as one of the most significant features of Jain religious practice. Yet, it is important to note that simply because the "liberal" Śvetāmbaras do not preclude spiritual liberation for women, women are still viewed in various ways - both positively and negatively - as shown by the Jain literary tradition.

Perception of women in Jainism 
As Manisha Sethi observes, "[T]here is no single archetype but a heterogeneity of ideals that appear sometimes to buttress women's claim to independent spiritual life, and at other times, to erode this pursuit." Her point brings to bear the fact that the broader Jain literary tradition has stories that both inspire and demonize Jain nuns and laywomen. For example, there are goddess beings such as the yakṣī Padmāvatī, who can intercede on behalf of "the non-salvational needs of their Jaina devotees, needs which cannot be met by the aloof, unresponsive, and totally-transcendent Tīrthaṅkaras." There are also stories about early Jain women whose chastity and righteousness eventually lead to their liberation, such as Rājīmatī, wife of the 22nd Tīrthaṅkara Neminātha.

Yet at the same time, women - be they laywomen or nuns - are viewed as sexual agents with potentially nefarious goals. Indeed, while Jain monks are meant to control their sexual desires via their ascetic practices, the Sūtṛakrtāṅga-sūtra details how "a woman will tempt [a monk] to a comfortable couch or bed" by seductive means. Women are seen as cat-like predators who prevent Jain monks from achieving their lofty spiritual goals. Unlike their lay counterparts, references to Jain nuns within the texts about monastic conduct are notably absent. This lack of representation, argues Sethi, is an act of erasure: denying women equal opportunity in renunciate activities and leaves the Jain spiritual worldview solely within the domain of male practitioners. However, nuns are not exempt from being characterized as dangerous sexual agents, as a Jain nun needs to both protect her own chastity from "potential molesters and rapists as well as her own self."

While representations of women as goddesses or chaste liberators within the literary tradition offers an alternative, and positive, vision of women within Jainism.

Mallī/Mallinātha 
Among the numerous figures within Jain texts, an important discussion is to be had regarding the 19th Tīrthaṅkara Mallinātha, who represents a unique case study in the debates and figurations of Jain women. For Śvetāmbara Jains, Mallinātha represents the capacity of women to achieve spiritual liberation, given that Mallinātha is depicted as a woman known as Mallī Devi. Mallī was a king in her previous life known as Mahā-bala, who, along with his six friends, decided to become a mendicant after hearing an ascetic preach. They all agreed to fast together, but Mahā-bala secretly desired to outperform his friends in their fasts. After they completed the life-ending fast known as sallekhanā, Mahā-bala's friends were reborn as gods and then kings; however, Mahā-bala was reborn as a woman because of his deceitful passion, which is considered to be a characteristic of women. Thus, despite the fact that Mallī rises to the occasion of Tīrthaṅkara, her gender is still a karmic defect or failure unlike the case of male Tīrthaṅkaras. Digambara Jains review the view that Mallinātha was a woman, as this would mean that he would have developed breasts and menstruated; both of these signs are deemed as paradoxical and too worldly for an enlightened Jina, who is meant to have shed all his karmas. The exact gender of Mallinātha is more complicated than this, as all but one Śvetāmbara image - "The 'Meditating Female,'" which is a 10th – 11th century image from Uttar Pradesh, actually represents Mallī as an "asexual being with the absence of the diacritical marks of her sex." In terms of Mallinātha's presence in the lives of Jain nuns and laywomen, Sethi observes that very few view Mallinātha as a role model for women, and in the Śvetāmbaras' case, "her presence in the Tīrthaṅkara pantheon [was] 'an exception and a wonderment'... likely to be never repeated again."

Roles of women in Jainism 
According to the Kalpa-sūtra, after the death of the Tīrthaṅkara Mahāvīra, the community that he organized "contained a body of female ascetics two and half times as large as the number of male ascetics." Further, the respected Candanbālā, a Jain female renouncer during the time of Mahāvīra, is said to have led a sangha of 36,000 female ascetics. These annotations highlight the fact that, while there was lively discussion and debate regarding female mendicants, women have been a part of the Jain monastic tradition for a long time. This has continued even unto modern times, where Sethi observes that the number of female ascetics within Jainism is far greater than that of male ascetics. Arguably, given that Jainism offers the possibility of liberation to women, women are seen as "legitimate aspirants and agents of salvation," where in other traditions - such as Hinduism - they may not. Despite the propensity of female ascetics in Jainism, this does not ignore the fact that they may still find themselves within a hierarchical system wherein male ascetics are viewed more positively. This is to say, the Jain monastic hierarchy "is structured through the gendered ideology of domesticity, with the patriarchal authority, consolidated in the figure of the ācārya/gacchādhipati, presiding over" the various mendicant orders. Thus, the highest rank of female monastics fails to have the same prestige or recognition as the highest rank of male monastics, the ācārya. Female ācāryas are a theoretical possibility, and two mendicant groups in the 1970s are known to be the exceptional cases where women have been given this status rank.

Gender and the third sex 
One of the consequences of debating whether or not women could be mendicants was an inquiry made by the Jains regarding who was a part of their larger community. To wit, the Jains accepted the pan-Indian idea of a third sex, who existed on the fringes of larger Indian society; however, given that the Jains were investigating whether or not women could become mendicants or attain spiritual liberation, they were simultaneously concerned about what it meant to be a man, woman, or neither/both.

The Jains rejected the Brahmanical view of gender as indicated by "the presence or absence of certain primary and secondary characteristics" and instead, "revalorized" the term veda, which referred to both biological sex and sexual feelings. What became important to the Jains was less the features or markers of gender, but rather, sexual behavior itself as seen by one's role in intercourse. This sexual behavior can be focused toward men, women, or both, and it is exactly this bisexual quality of the third sex that was accepted by Śvetāmbara and Digambara Jains. However, the bisexuality of a third-sex sexuality became accepted not as a third-sex identity itself, but rather, a sexuality, that can be possessed by male, female, or third-sex gendered people. Thus, by the 5th century, the Jains distinguished what they viewed as biological sex and psychological gender and sexuality, which allowed the possibility of "a biological male (dravyapuruṣa) [that] need not necessarily be a male psychologically (bhāvapuruṣa), that is, endowed with male sexuality, but he may in fact experience female or third-sex sexuality, and the same will be true, mutatis mutandis, for the two other sexes as well."

The third-sex, known as napuṃsakas, were an important consideration because there was a social stigma attached to them. As Zwilling and Sweet explain, the fear was that the broader populace would assume things wrongly of Jain mendicants if the napuṃsakas were ordained as monks or even if mendicants accepted alms from them. Thus, another reason why it was important to determine who was a part of the third-sex was to enforce monastic conduct and public opinion. However, over time, this ban grew lax, especially if third-sex people were especially well-connected to local people or they were seen as being especially able to control their sexuality.

Notes

References 
 Balbir, Nalini (2013). "Malli". Jainpedia: the Jain Universe online. 
 Cort, John (1987). "Medieval Jaina Goddess Traditions". Numen Vol. 34, no. 2, pp. 235–255.
 Dundas, Paul (2002). The Jains. London, UK: Routledge. .
 Hermann, Jacobi Georg (2008). Jaina Sutras: Part I & II. London, UK: Forgotten Books. .
 Jaini, Padmanabh (2000). Collected Papers on Jaina Studies. Delhi, India: Motilal Banarsidass Publishers. .
 Kelting, M. Whitney (2014). "Rājīmatī". Jainpedia: the Jain Universe online.
 Reddy, Gayatri (2005). With Respect to Sex: Negotiating Hijra Identity in South India. Chicago, IL: The University of Chicago Press. .
 Sethi, Manisha (2012). Escaping the World: Women Renouncers among Jains. London, UK: Routledge. .
 Umāsvāti (2010). Tattvārtha Sūtra: That Which Is. Translated by Nathmal Tatia. New Haven, CT: Yale University Press. 
 Zwilling, Leonard and Michael J. Sweet (2000). "The Evolution of Third-Sex Constructs in Ancient India: A Study in Ambiguity". Invented Identities: The Interplay of Gender, Religion and Politics in India. Oxford University Press. pp. 99–132. . 
 Zwilling, Leonard and Michael J Sweet (1996). "'Like a City Ablaze': The Third Sex and the Creation of Sexuality in Jain Religious Literature". Journal of the History of Sexuality Vol. 6, no. 3, pp. 359–384. 

 
Gender identity
Gender systems
Jainism and society